Korynetes is a genus of beetles belonging to the family Cleridae.

Species:
 Korynetes caeruleus (de Geer, 1775) 
 Korynetes geniculatus Klug, 1842 
 Korynetes ruficornis Sturm, 1837

References

Cleridae